Romahapa is a locality in the Catlins region of Otago in New Zealand's South Island.  It is located between the towns of Balclutha and Owaka. The last shop closed in 1977.

Education 

Romahapa has a small primary school, named Romahapa School.  It was established in 1856 and is one of the oldest schools in South Otago.  In mid-October 2006, it celebrated its 150th anniversary.

Railway 

On 15 December 1885, a branch line railway (the Catlins Branch Line) from the Main South Line in Balclutha was opened to Romahapa.  The village became a railway terminus for a few years and a number of bush tramways also operated in the area during the 1890s.  Romahapa lost its terminal status on 7 July 1891 when an extension opened to Glenomaru.  The railway line came to be known as the Catlins River Branch and ultimately terminated in Tahakopa; it serviced Romahapa until its closure on 27 February 1971.  In the early 1900s, up to sixteen trains ran through Romahapa a week; these were predominantly mixed trains.  Today, the Romahapa station's goods shed remains in its old location, while the station building has been resited a few kilometres away, and the wooden railway bridge over the Romahapa Creek still stands.

Notable people 
Liz Craig

References 

Populated places in Otago
The Catlins
Clutha District